The 2001 USC Trojans baseball team represented the University of Southern California collegiate sports in the 2001 NCAA Division I baseball season. The Trojans played their home games at Dedeaux Field. The team was coached by Mike Gillespie in his 15th year at USC.

The Trojans won the Los Angeles Regional and the Los Angeles Super Regional to advance to the College World Series, where they were defeated by the Tennessee Volunteers.

Roster

Schedule 

! style="" | Regular Season
|- valign="top" 

|- align="center" bgcolor="#ddffdd"
| 1 || January 31 ||  || No. 2 || Dedeaux Field • Los Angeles, California || W 10–3 || 1–0 || 0–0
|-

|- align="center" bgcolor="#ddffdd"
| 2 || February 3 ||  || No. 2 || Dedeaux Field • Los Angeles, California || W 19–4 || 2–0 || 0–0
|- align="center" bgcolor="#ddffdd"
| 3 || February 4 || Louisville || No. 2 || Dedeaux Field • Los Angeles, California || W 11–4 || 3–0 || 0–0
|- align="center" bgcolor="#ddffdd"
| 4 || February 6 || No. 12  || No. 2 || Dedeaux Field • Los Angeles, California || W 6–5 || 4–0 || 0–0
|- align="center" bgcolor="#ddffdd"
| 5 || February 9 || at No. 22  || No. 2 || Blair Field • Long Beach, California || W 6–2 || 5–0 || 0–0
|- align="center" bgcolor="#ddffdd"
| 6 || February 10 || No. 22 Long Beach State || No. 2 || Dedeaux Field • Los Angeles, California || W 10–1 || 6–0 || 0–0
|- align="center" bgcolor="#ffdddd"
| 7 || February 11 || at No. 22 Long Beach State || No. 2 || Blair Field • Long Beach, California || L 5–9 || 6–1 || 0–0
|- align="center" bgcolor="#ffdddd"
| 8 || February 16 || at  || No. 3 || Jackie Robinson Stadium • Los Angeles, California || L 3–4 || 6–2 || 0–0
|- align="center" bgcolor="#ddffdd"
| 9 || February 17 || at UCLA || No. 3 || Jackie Robinson Field • Los Angeles, California || W 6–0 || 7–2 || 0–0
|- align="center" bgcolor="#ddffdd"
| 10 || February 18 || at UCLA || No. 3 || Jackie Robinson Stadium • Los Angeles, California || W 5–4 || 8–2 || 0–0
|- align="center" bgcolor="#ffdddd"
| 11 || February 20 ||  || No. 3 || Dedeaux Field • Los Angeles, California || L 1–9 || 8–3 || 0–0
|- align="center" bgcolor="#ffdddd"
| 12 || February 21 || at  || No. 3 || Eddy D. Field Stadium • Malibu, California || L 3–5 || 8–4 || 0–0
|- align="center" bgcolor="#ddffdd"
| 13 || February 23 || No. 30  || No. 3 || Dedeaux Field • Los Angeles, California || W 7–3 || 9–4 || 0–0
|-

|- align="center" bgcolor="#ddffdd"
| 14 || March 3 || at  || No. 5 || Schroeder Park • Houston, Texas || W 6–3 || 10–4 || 0–0
|- align="center" bgcolor="#ddffdd"
| 15 || March 3 || at Houston || No. 5 || Schroeder Park • Houston, Texas || W 6–3 || 11–4 || 0–0
|- align="center" bgcolor="#ddffdd"
| 16 || March 4 || at Houston || No. 5 || Schroeder Park • Houston, Texas || W 4–3 || 12–4 || 0–0
|- align="center" bgcolor="#ffdddd"
| 17 || March 6 ||  || No. 4 || Dedeaux Field • Los Angeles, California || L 4–6 || 12–5 || 0–0
|- align="center" bgcolor="#ffdddd"
| 18 || March 9 || at No. 9 Stanford || No. 4 || Sunken Diamond • Stanford, California || L 0–2 || 12–6 || 0–0
|- align="center" bgcolor="#ffdddd"
| 19 || March 10 || at No. 9 Stanford || No. 4 || Sunken Diamond • Stanford, California || L 3–15 || 12–7 || 0–0
|- align="center" bgcolor="#ffdddd"
| 20 || March 11 || at No. 9 Stanford || No. 4 || Sunken Diamond • Stanford, California || L 5–9 || 12–8 || 0–0
|- align="center" bgcolor="#ddffdd"
| 21 || March 13 || at  || No. 13 || Caesar Uyesaka Stadium • Santa Barbara, California || W 12–5 || 13–8 || 0–0
|- align="center" bgcolor="#ddffdd"
| 22 || March 14 ||  || No. 13 || Dedeaux Field • Los Angeles, California || W 4–3 || 14–8 || 0–0
|- align="center" bgcolor="#ddffdd"
| 23 || March 17 || at  || No. 13 || Husky Ballpark • Seattle, Washington || W 5–1 || 15–8 || 1–0
|- align="center" bgcolor="#ffdddd"
| 24 || March 19 || at Washington || No. 12 || Husky Ballpark • Seattle, Washington || L 6–7 || 15–9 || 1–1
|- align="center" bgcolor="#ffdddd"
| 25 || March 19 || at Washington || No. 12 || Husky Ballpark • Seattle, Washington || L 3–7 || 15–10 || 1–2
|- align="center" bgcolor="#ddffdd"
| 26 || March 21 || No. 18 Pepperdine || No. 12 || Dedeaux Field • Los Angeles, California || W 9–3 || 16–10 || 1–2
|- align="center" bgcolor="#ddffdd"
| 27 || March 23 || at Arizona || No. 12 || Jerry Kindall Field at Frank Sancet Stadium • Tucson, Arizona || W 8–0 || 17–10 || 2–2
|- align="center" bgcolor="#ddffdd"
| 28 || March 24 || at Arizona || No. 12 || Jerry Kindall Field at Frank Sancet Stadium • Tucson, Arizona || W 6–4 || 18–10 || 3–2
|- align="center" bgcolor="#ddffdd"
| 29 || March 25 || at Arizona || No. 12 || Jerry Kindall Field at Frank Sancet Stadium • Tucson, Arizona || W 8–7 || 19–10 || 4–2
|- align="center" bgcolor="#ffdddd"
| 30 || March 27 || at No. 29 Cal State Fullerton || No. 12 || Titan Field • Fullerton, California || L 11–12 || 19–11 || 4–2
|- align="center" bgcolor="#ddffdd"
| 31 || March 28 ||  || No. 12 || Dedeaux Field • Los Angeles, California || W 16–7 || 20–11 || 4–2
|-

|- align="center" bgcolor="#ddffdd"
| 32 || April 3 || at San Diego State || No. 15 || Tony Gwynn Stadium • San Diego, California || W 2–1 || 21–11 || 4–2
|- align="center" bgcolor="#ddffdd"
| 33 || April 6 || No. 9  || No. 15 || Dedeaux Field • Los Angeles, California || W 11–2 || 22–11 || 5–2
|- align="center" bgcolor="#ddffdd"
| 34 || April 7 || No. 9 Arizona State || No. 15 || Dedeaux Field • Los Angeles, California || W 5–1 || 23–11 || 6–2
|- align="center" bgcolor="#ffdddd"
| 35 || April 8 || No. 9 Arizona State || No. 15 || Dedeaux Field • Los Angeles, California || L 1–11 || 23–12 || 6–3
|- align="center" bgcolor="#ddffdd"
| 36 || April 10 || UC Santa Barbara || No. 10 || Dedeaux Field • Los Angeles, California || W 6–4 || 24–12 || 6–3
|- align="center" bgcolor="#ddffdd"
| 37 || April 14 || at  || No. 10 || Evans Diamond • Berkeley, California || W 1–0 || 25–12 || 7–3
|- align="center" bgcolor="#ddffdd"
| 38 || April 15 || at California || No. 10 || Evans Diamond • Berkeley, California || W 5–3 || 26–12 || 8–3
|- align="center" bgcolor="#ffdddd"
| 39 || April 16 || at California || No. 10 || Evans Diamond • Berkeley, California || L 4–5 || 26–13 || 8–4
|- align="center" bgcolor="#ddffdd"
| 40 || April 17 || at UC Riverside || No. 7 || Riverside Sports Complex • Riverside, California || W 14–2 || 27–13 || 8–4
|- align="center" bgcolor="#ddffdd"
| 41 || April 20 || No. 1 Stanford || No. 7 || Dedeaux Field • Los Angeles, California || W 2–1 || 28–13 || 9–4
|- align="center" bgcolor="#ddffdd"
| 42 || April 21 || No. 1 Stanford || No. 7 || Dedeaux Field • Los Angeles, California || W 7–0 || 29–13 || 10–4
|- align="center" bgcolor="#ffdddd"
| 43 || April 22 || No. 1 Stanford || No. 7 || Dedeaux Field • Los Angeles, California || L 5–9 || 29–14 || 10–5
|- align="center" bgcolor="#ffdddd"
| 44 || April 23 ||  || No. 6 || Dedeaux Field • Los Angeles, California || L 8–10 || 29–15 || 10–5
|- align="center" bgcolor="#ffdddd"
| 45 || April 24 || at Loyola Marymount || No. 6 || George C. Page Stadium • Los Angeles, California || L 7–13 || 29–16 || 10–5
|- align="center" bgcolor="#ddffdd"
| 46 || April 27 || UCLA || No. 6 || Dedeaux Field • Los Angeles, California || W 2–0 || 30–16 || 11–5
|- align="center" bgcolor="#ddffdd"
| 47 || April 28 || UCLA || No. 6 || Dedeaux Field • Los Angeles, California || W 7–6 || 31–16 || 12–5
|- align="center" bgcolor="#ddffdd"
| 48 || April 29 || UCLA || No. 6 || Dedeaux Field • Los Angeles, California || W 7–1 || 32–16 || 13–5
|- align="center" bgcolor="#ddffdd"
| 49 || April 30 || at San Diego || No. 4 || Fowler Park • San Diego, California || W 5–4 || 33–16 || 13–5
|-

|- align="center" bgcolor="#ddffdd"
| 50 || May 12 ||  || No. 3 || Dedeaux Field • Los Angeles, California || W 7–6 || 34–16 || 14–5
|- align="center" bgcolor="#ddffdd"
| 51 || May 13 || Washington State || No. 3 || Dedeaux Field • Los Angeles, California || W 7–0 || 35–16 || 15–5
|- align="center" bgcolor="#ddffdd"
| 52 || May 14 || Washington State || No. 1 || Dedeaux Field • Los Angeles, California || W 5–1 || 36–16 || 16–5
|- align="center" bgcolor="#ddffdd"
| 53 || May 15 || Long Beach State || No. 1 || Dedeaux Field • Los Angeles, California || W 10–2 || 37–16 || 16–5
|- align="center" bgcolor="#ddffdd"
| 54 || May 18 || at  || No. 1 || Goss Stadium at Coleman Field • Beaverton, Oregon || W 7–3 || 38–16 || 17–5
|- align="center" bgcolor="#ffdddd"
| 55 || May 19 || at Oregon State || No. 1 || Goss Stadium at Coleman Field • Beaverton, Oregon || L 0–6 || 38–17 || 17–6
|- align="center" bgcolor="#ddffdd"
| 56 || May 20 || at Oregon State || No. 1 || Goss Stadium at Coleman Field • Beaverton, Oregon || W 1–0 || 39–17 || 18–6
|-

|-
! style="" | Postseason
|- valign="top"

|- align="center" bgcolor="#ddffdd"
| 57 || May 25 || (4) No. 25  || (1) No. 2 || Dedeaux Field • Los Angeles, California || W 12–4 || 40–17 || 18–6
|- align="center" bgcolor="#ddffdd"
| 58 || May 26 || (2) No. 13 Pepperdine || (1) No. 2 || Dedeaux Field • Los Angeles, California || W 4–3 || 41–17 || 18–6
|- align="center" bgcolor="#ddffdd"
| 59 || May 27 || (3)  || (1) No. 2 || Dedeaux Field • Los Angeles, California || W 8–0 || 42–17 || 18–6
|-

|- align="center" bgcolor="#ddffdd"
| 60 || June 1 || No. 19  || (3) No. 2 || Dedeaux Field • Los Angeles, California || W 5–1 || 43–17 || 18–6
|- align="center" bgcolor="#ddffdd"
| 61 || June 2 || No. 19 FIU || (3) No. 2 || Dedeaux Field • Los Angeles, California || W 6–0 || 44–17 || 18–6
|-

|- align="center" bgcolor="#ddffdd"
| 62 || June 9 || vs. (6) No. 7  || (3) No. 2 || Johnny Rosenblatt Stadium • Omaha, Nebraska || W 11–5 || 45–17 || 18–6
|- align="center" bgcolor="#ffdddd"
| 63 || June 11 || vs. (2) No. 1 Miami (FL) || (3) No. 2 || Johnny Rosenblatt Stadium • Omaha, Nebraska || L 3–4 || 45–18 || 18–6
|- align="center" bgcolor="#ffdddd"
| 64 || June 12 || vs. No. 8  || (3) No. 2 || Johnny Rosenblatt Stadium • Omaha, Nebraska || L 2–10 || 45–19 || 18–6
|-

|

Awards and honors 
Brian Barre
 First Team All-Pac-10

Alberto Concepcion
 Honorable Mention All-Pac-10

Rik Currier
 Second Team All-American The Sports Network
 Third Team All-American Baseball America
 Third Team All-American Collegiate Baseball
 First Team All-Pac-10

Anthony Lunetta
 Honorable Mention All-Pac-10

Michael Moon
 Honorable Mention All-Pac-10

Mark Prior
 First Team All-American American Baseball Coaches Association
 First Team All-American Baseball America
 First Team All-American Collegiate Baseball
 First Team All-American National Collegiate Baseball Writers Association
 First Team All-American The Sports Network
 First Team All-American USA Today Sports Weekly
 Pac-10 Conference Pitcher of the Year
 First Team All-Pac-10

Bill Peavey
 Honorable Mention All-Pac-10

Josh Persell
 Honorable Mention All-Pac-10

References 

USC Trojans baseball seasons
USC Trojans baseball
College World Series seasons
USC
USC
Pac-12 Conference baseball champion seasons